Alison Johns is the chief executive of the Leadership Foundation for Higher Education, and a past president of the Association of University Administrators.

In December 2017 she was named as the chief executive officer-designate of a new organisation which will consist of the former Leadership Foundation, the Equality Challenge Unit and the Higher Education Academy.

Education 

Johns has a masters in management learning from Lancaster University where she studied part-time in the 1990s.

References 

Living people
British chief executives
Alumni of Lancaster University
Year of birth missing (living people)